Non-chaperonin molecular chaperone ATPase (molecular chaperone Hsc70 ATPase) is an enzyme with systematic name ATP phosphohydrolase (polypeptide-polymerizing). This enzyme catalyses the following chemical reaction

 ATP + H2O  ADP + phosphate

These enzymes perform many functions that are similar to those of chaperonins.

See also 
 Chaperone (protein)

References

External links 
 

EC 3.6.4